SS Friedrich der Grosse (or Friedrich der Große) was a Norddeutscher Lloyd liner built in 1896 which sailed Atlantic routes from Germany and sometimes Italy to the United States and on the post run to Australia. At the outset of World War I the ship was interned by the U.S. and, when that country entered the conflict in 1917, was seized and converted to a troop transport, becoming USS Huron (ID-1408).

Originally commissioned as USS Fredrick Der Grosse, the ship was renamed Huron – after Lake Huron, the center lake of the Great Lakes – while undergoing repairs and conversion at a U.S. Navy yard. The ship carried almost 21,000 men to France during the hostilities, and returned over 22,000 healthy and wounded men after the Armistice.

After decommissioning by the U.S. Navy, the ship was turned over to the United States Shipping Board and was later transferred to the United States Mail Steamship Company, for whom she sailed in the Atlantic as SS Huron. In May 1922 the ship was allocated to the Los Angeles Steamship Co. and renamed SS City of Honolulu. The ship caught fire on 12 October 1922 during her maiden voyage, and sank with no loss of life.

History

SS Friedrich der Grosse
SS Friedrich der Grosse (or Friedrich der Große) was built in 1896 by Vulcan Shipbuilding Corp. of Stettin, Germany, and sailed the Atlantic for North German Lloyd until being interned in New York Harbor in 1914.

On 27 July 1900, the deck of Friedrich der Grosse was the site of Kaiser Wilhelm II's famous "Schrecklichkeit" speech in which he compared the military of the German Empire to the Huns.

U.S. Navy transport
The United States Government interned German and Austro-Hungarian ships wherever they had put into port, and seized Friedrich der Grosse, leaving it anchored in New York harbour, but still under German ownership.

During this time, in 1915, German spy Franz von Rintelen used the interned ship as an offshore bomb-making laboratory for manufacturing the newly invented pencil bomb devices that were used to destroy cargoes on 36 ships.

Later, upon the entrance of the United States into the hostilities on the side of the Allied and Associated Powers – on 6 April 1917 – the ship was permanently seized and assigned to the United States Shipping Board (USSB). U.S. Customs agents boarded Friedrich der Grosse in the port of New York, along with 30 other German and Austro-Hungarian vessels, and sent their crews to an internment camp on Ellis Island. However, before these sailors left their ships, they carried out a program of systematic destruction calculated to take the longest possible time to repair.

Friederich der Grosse was taken to Robbins Drydock Co. in Brooklyn for repairs. The USSB then turned the ship over to the U.S. Navy, and she was commissioned at New York Navy Yard on 25 July 1917 as Fredrick Der Grosse. The ship, Commander S. H. R. Doyle in command, was renamed Huron on 1 September 1917 after the center lake of the Great Lakes.

Huron acted as a troop transport during the remaining years of the war. During the beginning of one voyage to France. Huron, in convoy, departed Hoboken on 23 April 1918. Two days out, a steering gear casualty in the transport  forced that ship to leave her assigned place in the formation. To avoid collision with Siboney, transport  altered course radically and in so doing struck Huron at about 21:00 on 25 April. Fortunately, there were no deaths; but both transports were damaged, which necessitated their turning back.

While the signing of the armistice of 11 November 1918 signalled the end of hostilities, it only meant the beginning of the task of returning American troops from "over there". During the war, Huron had transported 20,871 men to the European battlefront in her eight voyages. In the postwar months, Huron conducted a further seven turn-around voyages, bringing back some 20,582 healthy veterans, and some 1,546 wounded and sick. Huron reached New York City on 23 August and was decommissioned on 2 September for return to the USSB.

Post-war service

Huron operated on Atlantic South American routes for the United States Mail Steamship Company from 1920 to 1922. Renamed City of Honolulu in May 1922, she was turned over to the Los Angeles Steamship Co. for passenger service from Los Angeles to Honolulu.

The captain ordered everyone to the lifeboats after it became apparent that the fire could not be brought under control. None of the passengers or crew were killed or seriously injured during either the firefighting attempts or the orderly evacuation of the liner. The passengers were rescued by freighter West Faralon, the first ship on the scene, but transferred to United States Army transport ship Thomas for return to Los Angeles.

United States Coast Guard Cutter  and tug  were dispatched to either tow or sink the hulk of City of Honolulu.

Notes

References

External links

Photo gallery of Huron at NavSource Naval History

 Rio de Janeiro is Now Only 11 Days Away (United States Shipping Board advertisement/Munson Steamship Line's advertisement with ship description)

Barbarossa-class ocean liners
Ships of Norddeutscher Lloyd
Passenger ships of the United States
Maritime incidents in 1922
1896 ships
Ships built in Stettin
Shipwrecks in the Pacific Ocean